Denis Hilton Streak (born 21 June 1949) is a Zimbabwean former first-class cricketer and the father of former Zimbabwean cricketer, Heath Streak. Apart from playing cricket, he also represented Zimbabwe at lawn bowls.

He debuted for Rhodesia during the 1976-77 Currie Cup and toured England in 1985. Streak played domestic cricket with Matabeleland and was 46 when he finally retired.  He finished by playing in a Logan Cup final win, in the same side at his son.  After retiring, he was briefly a Zimbabwean selector.

Streak's farm was seized in 2001 under a land reform policy and after protesting, he ended up imprisoned for a short time.

References

External links 

1949 births
Living people
Cricketers from Bulawayo
White Zimbabwean sportspeople
Zimbabwean people of British descent
Zimbabwean farmers
Zimbabwean cricketers
Rhodesia cricketers
Matabeleland cricketers